These are lists of songs dedicated to association football or composed for clubs or players:
 List of FIFA World Cup official songs

Other songs dedicated to football
 Sela Sela (Dance Together) by Zahra Universe & Wes (official song of Africa Cup of Nations 2013) (2013)
 Carnaval de Paris by Dario G (1998)
 Força by Nelly Furtado (official song of Euro 2004) (2003)
 País do Futebol by MC Guime featuring Emicida (2013)
 Grito Mundial by Daddy Yankee (2009)
 Love Generation by Bob Sinclar (2005)
 La Copa de Todos by Wisin, Paty Cantú and David Corey (2013)
 Oh Africa by Akon (2010)
 É Uma Partida De Futebol by Skank (1997)
 Endless Summer by Oceana (official song of Euro 2012) (2012)
 Come Alive by Ahmed Chawki featuring RedOne (official song of FIFA Club World Cup 2014)
 Mostra tua força Brasil by Paulo Miklos and Fernanda Takai (2014)
 Gol by Cali & El Dandee (2011)
 Magic In The Air by Magic System featuring Chawki
 Vai Na Fé by Edcity, Ronaldinho (2013)
 #Futebol by DJ Alpha featuring Séan Garnier & Les Francis (2014)
 Three Lions by The Lightning Seeds (1996)
 Meu Mundo É Uma Bola by Sérgio Mendes (1977)
 Hola, Hola (L'hymne de la CAN 2015) by Molare, Toofan, Eddy Kenzo, Singuila, Cano and Wizboyy (official song of Africa Cup of Nations 2015) (2015)
 Un Sueño by Nicky Jam (2015)
 Eu Quero Tchu, Eu Quero Tcha by Joao Lucas & Marcelo (2012)
 This One's For You by David Guetta featuring Zara Larsson (official song of Euro 2016) (2016)
 Yalla Asia by Jay Sean featuring Karl Wolf (2011)
 Creo en América by Diego Torres (official song of Copa América 2011) (2011)
 On Va La Foutre Au Fond by Sébastien Patoche (2014)
 Imaginate viene Messi por aquí by Toch
 Al Sur del Mundo by Noche de Brujas (official song of Copa América 2015) (2015)
 Song for Bafana Bafana by Chanku (2010)
 Que El Futbol No Pare by Patricia Manterola (2002)
 Stand Up! (Champions Theme) by Patrizio Buanne (2006)
 Vida by Ricky Martin (2014)
 Tempo de Alegria by Ivete Sangalo (2014)
 Ona Kayako (Chipolopolo 2012) by MC Wabwino featuring Utaka (2012)
 Vem Pra Rua by Marcelo Falcão (2013)
 Somos um só by Aerobanda and Tavito (2014)
 Beautiful Goal by Paul Oakenfold (2006)
 Goleador by Samba Tri
 Majesteit by Youp van 't Hek and Guus Meeuwis (2010)
 La leva calcistica del '68 by Francesco De Gregori
 Simplemente Fútbol by Axel (2013)
 Vai Meu Brasil by Fia Fer (2014)
 Simplemente Fútbol by La Mosca
 Superstars by Pitbull featuring Becky G (official song of Copa América Centenario 2016) (2016)
 La Copa América by Dj Méndez (2015)
 A Taça do Mundo é Nossa by Aerobanda (1958)
 El Mundial by Ennio Morricone and his orchestra (1978)
 Voa Canarinho Voa by Povo Feliz (1982)
 Sevillanas del Mundial '82 by Pepe da Rosa (1982)
 El Equipo Tricolor by 1986 Mexico national football team (1986)
 Papa Éssa Brasil (1990)
 Coração Verde e Amarelo by Aerobanda (1994)
 Rendez-Vous 98 by Jean Michel Jarre featuring Apollo 440 (1998)
 Quiero Verte Ganar by Tomo Como Rey (2009)
 Pra Frente Brasil by Coral JOAB (1970)
 The World at their Feet by John Shakespeare Orchestra (1970)
 Lap of Honour by London Stadium Orchestra (1970)
 Go get the Cup by David Hanselmann (1990)
 Música oficial da Seleção Nacional Portugal by Kika (2014)
 Numero Uno (Luca Toni) by Matze Knop (2009)
 Qué Es Dios by Las Pastillas Del Abuelo (2008)
 Pie De Oro Llegó by La Banda del Tigre Ariel (2007)
 El Pistolero by Resk-T
 Gimme Hope Joachim by Basta (2010)
 Fussball Ist Unser Leben by 1974 West Germany national football team  (1974)
 Ole Ole Ole by The Fans
 World Cup Fanfare by Werner Drexler (1974)
 Lu Lu Lu Lukas Podolski Song (2010)
 Zlatan song by Sanjin and Youthman(2017)
 11 kleine Spanier (2010)
 Zelena je trava by Trawa jest zielona (2010)
¡Podemos España! (2008)
Toco y me voy by Bersuit Vergarabat (2000)
Jugador del año by Trueno, Acru and Bizarrap

Songs dedicated to clubs
 
 100. Yıl Albümü (an album following the Turkish League triumph of Beşiktaş in 2003 and their 100th year of foundation)
 Wij zijn Ajax by Ajax and Friends
 Clublied by Ajax
 Ajax Is Kampioen by Danny Lukassen
 Dit Is Mijn Club (Ajax)
 Bloed, zweet en tranen by André Hazes (Ajax) (2002)
Blue Day by Suggs (song related to Chelsea FC) (1997)
Hala Madrid y nada más by Real Madrid featuring RedOne (official song for Real Madrid´s tenth title of UEFA Champions League)
 Song for Pride by Persebaya
 Merah Kuning by Selangor

Songs dedicated to football players
 Maradona, by Andres Calamaro (1999)
La Mano De Dios by Rodrigo (2000)
 Santa Maradona by Mano Negra (1994)
 Mario Gomez song (2013)
 Baggio Baggio - Lucio Dalla
 Will Griggs on Fire - DJ Kenno (2016)
 Baila Como El Papu - Gli Autogol, DJ Matrix (2017)
 Zinedine Zidane by Vaudeville Smash, Les Murray
 Thiago Silva by Dave
 Saint Maximin
 Strachan by The Hitchers

Anthems
 FIFA Anthem by Franz Lambert (1994)
 AFC Anthem by Lee Dong-june (Asian Football Confederation Official Anthem) (2014)
 A Song of Joy by Miguel Ríos (Copa Libertadores Anthem) (1969)
 UEFA Champions League Anthem by Tony Britten (1992)
 Ode to Joy by Ludwig van Beethoven (UEFA European Qualifiers Official Anthem)

See also
 Football chant

References

 
Association football culture